Graham Quinn may refer to:

 Graham Quinn (athlete) (1912–1987), New Zealand track and field athlete
 Graham Quinn (rugby league) (born 1957), Australian former rugby league footballer